There have been five baronetcies created for persons with the surname Young, one in the Baronetage of England, one in the Baronetage of Great Britain and three in the Baronetage of the United Kingdom. As of 2014, four of the creations are extant.

The Young Baronetcy, of London, was created in the Baronetage of England on 10 March 1628 for Richard Young, who represented Dover in the House of Commons. The title became extinct on his death in 1651.

The Young Baronetcy, of Dominica, was created in the Baronetage of Great Britain on 2 May 1769 for William Young, Lieutenant-Governor of Dominica. The second Baronet served as Governor of Tobago while the fourth Baronet sat as Member of Parliament for Buckinghamshire. The fifth Baronet was killed at the Battle of Alma in the Crimean War while his younger brother, the sixth Baronet, died during the Siege of Sevastopol in the same conflict. The ninth Baronet was Envoy Extraordinary to Guatemala and Yugoslavia.

The Young Baronetcy, of Formosa Place in the County of Berkshire, was created in the Baronetage of the United Kingdom on 24 November 1813 for Samuel Young. He was the eldest son of Admiral of the White Sir George Young. , the present holder of the title is Sir George Young, a Conservative politician who was appointed Chief Whip from October 2012. Geoffrey Winthrop Young and Hilton Young, 1st Baron Kennet, were younger sons of the third Baronet.

The Young Baronetcy, of Bailieborough Castle in the County of Cavan, was created in the Baronetage of the United Kingdom on 28 August 1821 for William Young. He was a Director of the East India Company. The second Baronet served as Governor General of Canada from 1869 to 1872 and was raised to the peerage as Baron Lisgar, of Lisgar and Bailieborough in the County of Cavan, in 1870. However, the peerage became extinct on his death in 1876 while he was succeeded in the baronetcy by his nephew, the third Baronet.

The Young Baronetcy, of Partick in the City of Glasgow, was created in the Baronetage of the United Kingdom on 7 September 1945 for Arthur Young, who represented Glasgow Partick and Glasgow Scotstoun in the House of Commons as a Conservative.  It is currently held by Sir Stephen Young QC, Sheriff Principal of Grampian, Highland and Islands.

Young baronets, of London (1628)
Sir Richard Young, 1st Baronet

Young baronets, of Dominica (1769)

Sir William Young, 1st Baronet (1725–1788)
Sir William Young, 2nd Baronet (–1815)
Sir William Lawrence Young, 3rd Baronet (c. 1778–1824)
Sir William Lawrence Young, 4th Baronet (1806–1842)
Sir William Norris Young, 5th Baronet (1833–1854)
Sir George John Young, 6th Baronet (1835–1854) 
Sir Charles Lawrence Young, 7th Baronet (1839–1887), barrister and amateur actor and dramatist, author of Jim the Penman
Sir William Lawrence Young, 8th Baronet (1864–1921)
Sir (Charles) Alban Young, 9th Baronet (1865–1944)
Sir William Neil Young, 10th Baronet (born 1941)

The heir apparent is the present holder's son William Lawrence Elliot Young (born 1970).
The heir apparent's heir apparent is his son Leon Elliot Young (born 2002).

Young baronets, of Formosa Place (1813)

Sir Samuel Young, 1st Baronet (1766–1826)
Sir George Young, 2nd Baronet (1797–1848)
Sir George Young, 3rd Baronet (1837–1930)
Sir George Young, 4th Baronet (1872–1952)
Sir George Peregrine Young, 5th Baronet (1908–1960)
George Samuel Knatchbull Young, Baron Young of Cookham, 6th Baronet (born 1941)

The heir apparent is the present holder's son the Hon. George "Gerry" Horatio Young (born 1966).

The heir apparent's heir apparent is his son George Young (born 2003).

Young baronets, of Bailieborough Castle (1821)

Sir William Young, 1st Baronet (d. 1848)
Sir John Young, 2nd Baronet (1807–1876) (created Baron Lisgar in 1870)

Barons Lisgar (1870)
John Young, 1st Baron Lisgar (1807–1876)

Young baronets, of Bailieborough Castle (1821; reverted)
Sir William Muston Need Young, 3rd Baronet (1847–1934)
Captain John Edgar Harington Young (1871–1902)
John Ferrers Harington Young (1897–1916)
Sir Cyril Roe Muston Young, 4th Baronet (1881–1955)
Sir John William Roe Young, 5th Baronet (1913–1981)
Sir John Kenyon Roe Young, 6th Baronet (born 1947)

The heir apparent is the present holder's son Richard Christopher Roe Young (born 1983).

Young baronets, of Partick (1945)

Sir Arthur Stewart Leslie Young, 1st Baronet (1889–1950)
Sir Alastair Spencer Templeton Young, 2nd Baronet (1918–1963)
Sir Stephen Stewart Templeton Young, 3rd Baronet (born 1947)

The heir apparent is the present holder's son Charles Alastair Stephen Young (born 1979).

See also
Baron Kennet

Notes

References 
Kidd, Charles, Williamson, David (editors). Debrett's Peerage and Baronetage (1990 edition). New York: St Martin's Press, 1990, 
Dudgeon, Tim. Bats, Baronets and Battle: A Social History of Cricket and Cricketers from an East Sussex Town. AuthorHouse, 2013, 236 Page

External links

Extinct baronetcies in the Baronetage of England
Baronetcies in the Baronetage of Great Britain
Baronetcies in the Baronetage of the United Kingdom
1628 establishments in England
1769 establishments in Great Britain
1813 establishments in the United Kingdom
Clan Young